Friedrich Fehleisen (1854–1924) was a German surgeon whose work focused on streptococcal bacteria. Dr. Fehleisen's work played a necessary role in the eventual uncovering of the etiology of many streptococcal illnesses. He made integral contributions to modern medicine's understanding of the Streptococcus pyogenes organism. He was born in Reutlingen, Württemberg, in 1854, and died in San Francisco, California, in 1924.

S. pyogenes and erysipelas 
In 1883, he became the first person to culture and collect Streptococcus pyogenes, which causes scarlet fever and other streptococcal illnesses. He cultured it from perierysipelas lesions on humans. One year later, the organism received its current name from Rosenbach. German physician Friedrich Loeffler subsequently demonstrated the presence of streptococci in the throats of patients with scarlet fever.

Additionally, Dr. Fehleisen uncovered the etiology of erysipelas, which is an acute streptococcal bacterial infection of the upper dermis and superficial lymphatics. His literature "Die Aetiologie Des Erysipels", which was originally published in 1883, outlines his findings.

Cancer immunotherapy 

Following his discovery of S. pyogenes being the causative agent of erysipelas, Fehleisen repeated Busch experiments inoculating sarcoma patients with it, noting regression in many of them. His first patient, a 58 man with a fibrosarcoma of the gluteus, got a significant remission, although the very high fever of 41°C made Fehleisen question the utility of this method as a therapy.

Fehleisen observations later inspired William Coley to try the method on his patients and eventually developing Coley's toxins.

References

Further reading
 

1854 births
1924 deaths
German surgeons
People from Reutlingen
German microbiologists